Ibrahim Somé Salombo (born 24 May 1988 in Kinshasa) is a Congolese football striker who is currently playing for Olympic Charleroi in the Belgian Second Amateur Division.

Club career
He started playing in his home country first with SC Inter de Kinshasa and then with SC Cilu in Linafoot, the top-league of the country. During the 2005–06 season he moved abroad to South Africa and joined Ajax Cape Town playing with them until the end of the 2005–06 Premier Soccer League.

In summer 2006 he moved to Europe. He signed with Belgian side FC Brussels but failed to make any appearance in the league. Following summer he moved to Lokeren and debuted in the 2007–08 Belgian First Division. At the winter-break he agreed to a loan to Serbian side FK Bežanija where he played the second half of the season.

Somé Salombo scored four goals in eleven appearances with Bežanija in the 2007–08 Serbian SuperLiga and his performance attracted attention from Serbian giants Red Star Belgrade who signed him in summer 2008. However, 2008–09 was a turbulent season for Red Star and Somé left having made three goals in sixteen appearances in the SuperLiga. He returned to Belgium and made a solid season with Dender in 2009–10 Belgian Second Division.

In summer 2011 he moved to Luxembourg and joined F91 Dudelange in Luxembourg. He contributed with seven goals in thirteen appearances for Dudelange to become champion. After that productive season in Luxembourg National Division, he returned to Belgium and played the following two seasons in third level side UR La Louvière Centre. While playing with La Louvière he was elected the player of the season in June 2012 by the fans.

In 2013, he signed RWDM Brussels in what was the return of Somé to the second level. He spent the second half of the 2013–14 Belgian Second Division season playing on loan at Sint-Truiden. Following season he stayed in same league but playing with OH Leuven. In 2015, he signed with White Star Bruxelles and became champion of Belgian Second Division. White Star should have been promoted to the Belgian Pro League however, the Belgian professional football license was refused to them by the Belgian FA, thus the club ended up relegated to the Belgian First Amateur Division instead, and Somé left White Star and signed with RWDM47.

In August 2021, Somé joined Belgian Division 2 amateur club RSD Jette.

International career
He has been a member of the DR Congo national team since 2006. He made four appearances until 2010, plus one FIFA unofficial one in 2010.

Honours
F91 Dudelange
Luxembourg National Division: 2010–11

White Star Bruxelles
Belgian Second Division: 2015–16

References

External links
 
 
 
 Worst Foreign Striker – Ibrahim Some Salombo

1988 births
Living people
Footballers from Kinshasa
Democratic Republic of the Congo footballers
Democratic Republic of the Congo international footballers
Association football forwards
21st-century Democratic Republic of the Congo people
K.S.C. Lokeren Oost-Vlaanderen players
SC Cilu players
Cape Town Spurs F.C. players
R.W.D.M. Brussels F.C. players
F.C.V. Dender E.H. players
Sint-Truidense V.V. players
Red Star Belgrade footballers
FK Bežanija players
F91 Dudelange players
UR La Louvière Centre players
RWDM47 players
Oud-Heverlee Leuven players
RWS Bruxelles players
R. Olympic Charleroi Châtelet Farciennes players
Challenger Pro League players
Serbian SuperLiga players
Belgian Pro League players
Democratic Republic of the Congo expatriate sportspeople in Belgium
Democratic Republic of the Congo expatriate sportspeople in South Africa
Democratic Republic of the Congo expatriate sportspeople in Luxembourg
Expatriate soccer players in South Africa
Expatriate footballers in Serbia
Expatriate footballers in Belgium
Expatriate footballers in Luxembourg